National Tertiary Route 742, or just Route 742 (or ) is a National Road Route of Costa Rica, located in the Alajuela, Puntarenas provinces.

Description
In Alajuela province the route covers San Ramón canton (San Ramón, Piedades Norte, Piedades Sur, Alfaro, Zapotal districts).

In Puntarenas province the route covers Esparza canton (Macacona, San Jerónimo districts).

References

Highways in Costa Rica